The 2011 Christchurch Borough Council election took place on 5 May 2011 to elect members of Christchurch Borough Council in Dorset, England. The whole council was up for election and the Conservative Party stayed in overall control of the council.

Election result
The Conservatives increased their majority on the council after winning 21 of the 24 seats. They gained both of the seats in Portfield ward from the Liberal Democrats, with Conservatives Margaret Phipps and Lisle Smith being elected. A further gain came in Town Centre where Conservative Gillian Geary took one of the two seats for the ward, while Paul Hilliard was elected for the first time in Grange ward.

The Liberal Democrat defeats in Portfield and Town Centre wards reduced them to just one seat on the council, with Peter Hall in Town Centre ward being the party's only councillor. The only other non-Conservatives elected were independents Colin Bungey and Fred Neale who were re-elected in Jumpers ward. Overall turnout at the election was 48.7%.

Following the election Ray Nottage was chosen by the Conservative group as the new leader of the council.

Ward results

References

2011
2011 English local elections